Spooks and Spirits (Ófeigur gengur aftur in its original Icelandic) is a 2013 Icelandic fantasy-comedy film written and directed by Ágúst Guðmundsson.

Cast
 Þórhallur Sigurðsson as Ofeig
 Gísli Örn Garðarsson as Ingi Brjánn
 Ilmur Kristjánsdóttir as Anna Sól
 Ágúst Guðmundsson as Prestur

Release
Spooks and Spirits made its North American premiere at the 36th Mill Valley Film Festival in October 2013.

References

External links
 

2013 films
2010s fantasy comedy films
Films directed by Ágúst Guðmundsson
Icelandic fantasy comedy films
2010s Icelandic-language films
2013 comedy films